Chrysogaster cemiteriorum is a European species of hoverfly which can be found feeding on umbelliferous flowers wetlands and damp meadows.

Description
For terms see Morphology of DipteraAnterior lower part of mesopleuron (above and posterior to coxa) and hypopleuron covered with grey coating. Face in male very broad and the surstyli obtuse. A large Chrysogaster with a body length body of 6.0 to 8.0.mm.

See references for determination.

Distribution
The Palearctic. Scandinavia South to the Mediterranean basin; Ireland East through Europe (including the Alps) into European Russia, Siberia and the Russian Far East.

Habitat
Fen, valley bog and taiga.

Biology
Flies over and among fen and damp meadow vegetation from June to September. Flowers visited include white umbellifers and Sambucus ebulus.

References

Diptera of Europe
Eristalinae
Flies described in 1758
Taxa named by Carl Linnaeus